Raymond Rowe (born 1984) is an American wrestler.

Ray or Raymond Rowe may also refer to:

Ray Rowe (American football) (born 1969), American football player
Raymond Rowe (cricketer) (1913–1995), Australian cricketer